The Lithuania Hockey League is the premier men's ice hockey league in Lithuania.

Teams

Champions
 1992 – SC Energija	
 1993 – SC Energija
 1994 – SC Energija
 1995 – SC Energija
 1996 – SC Energija
 1997 – SC Energija
 1998 – SC Energija
 1999 – SC Energija
 2000 – Viltis Elektrėnai
 2001 – SC Energija
 2002 – Garsų Pasaulis Vilnius	
 2003 – SC Energija
 2004 – SC Energija
 2005 – SC Energija
 2006 – SC Energija
 2007 – SC Energija
 2008 – SC Energija
 2009 – SC Energija
 2010 – Sporto Centras Elektrėnai
 2011 – Sporto Centras Elektrėnai
 2012 – ESSM Energija Elektrėnai
 2013 – SC Energija
 2014 – Delovaja Rus Kaliningrad
 2015 – Delovaja Rus Kaliningrad
 2016 – SC Energija
 2017 – SC Energija
 2018 – SC Energija
 2019 – SC Energija
 2020 – not finished
 2021 – Kaunas Hockey
 2022 – Hockey Punks
 2023 – Kaunas City

Titles by team

References

External links
 Lithuanian Ice Hockey Federation
 Lithuania hockey league on eurohockey.com
 Lithuania hockey league on eliteprospects.com

 
Professional ice hockey leagues in Lithuania
Top tier ice hockey leagues in Europe